Football Club Isle of Man is a semi-professional football club based in Douglas, Isle of Man, that competes in the , the 9th tier of English football.

Founded in 2019, the club joined the NWCFL for the 2020–21 season; however, due to the COVID-19 pandemic, they did not start the 2020–21 season, which was ultimately abandoned on 24 February 2021. They played their inaugural match at their home ground, The Bowl, against Guernsey F.C. in the summer of 2020, competing for the newly formed Skipton Cup; the match ended in a 1–0 victory for F.C. Isle of Man.

F.C. Isle of Man returned to the NWCFL for the start the 2021–22 NWCFL Division One South season. They played their first league game ever against Maine Road on 31 July 2021, which resulted in a 1–1 draw. They subsequently played a further 15 away games in a row before finally playing their first home league game on 30 October 2021, against Brocton, coming from behind to win 2–1 in front of 2,012 supporters.

The Ravens ultimately finished second in the league, narrowly missing out on actual silverware by five points behind West Didsbury & Chorlton, and were placed into the league play-offs with home advantage against three other teams. On 9 April 2022, they played Wythenshawe Amateurs in the play-off semi-final, beating them 3–0 to secure a place in the final against New Mills The Ravens went on to win promotion to the NWCFL Premier Division on the 16 April 2022, defeating New Mills in the play-off final, winning 4–2 in front of a record-breaking home attendance of 3,230 supporters.

F.C. Isle of Man covers the costs of visiting clubs' and match officials' travel and hotel expenses for the games which is a considerable commitment, but also shows the seriousness of the club's plans to compete in the English league pyramid.

The club is not affiliated with the Isle of Man Government; it is owned by its parent company Sporting Club Isle of Man. The club is owned by the local community, funded by the sale of various memberships which offer exclusive benefits, including early and discounted access to match day and season ticket sales.

History
In August 2019, F.C. Isle of Man confirmed their intentions to enter a team into the English football league system at step six of non-league. On 8 October 2019, the club announced it had become affiliated with the Isle of Man Football Association, following the backing of clubs in the Manx football system. However, there was opposition to the move from some local clubs and supporters over F.C. Isle of Man cherry-picking the best players from teams around the island and other clubs losing out on potential spectators. To ease this concern, F.C. Isle of Man kicks off its games in the later time slot of 18:30 to avoid any potential clash with the local league, which consists of 26 teams.

On 18 February 2020, St Georges manager Chris Bass was announced as the club's first manager. On 7 November 2022, following a run of mixed results, an announcement was made that the club and Bass had parted company with Director of Football Paul Jones taking over from Bass until the end of the season.

During February 2023 the club began the process to find a permanent manager for the 2023-24 campaign. Whilst still in his interim role the club were keen to ensure that should he wished, Jones would be able to apply for the job on a fulltime basis.

On 21 February 2020, the North West Counties Football League confirmed F.C. Isle of Man had submitted an application to join the league in time for the 2020–21 season.

On 21 July 2020, it was announced that the club would participate in the North West Counties Football League First Division South. Due to the COVID-19 restrictions, the team withdrew from the 2020–21 FA Vase before their first qualifying round match. On 7 December, the club was temporarily suspended from the league as it had become apparent that they would not be able to complete all their fixtures by 31 May 2021, as required by The Football Association.

F.C. Isle of Man played their first competitive league match against Maine Road F.C. on 31 July 2021, with Frank Jones scoring the club's first competitive goal. The match ended in a 1–1 draw. Their first season ended in success as despite a second-placed finish, a 4–2 victory over New Mills FC on 16 April 2022, saw the club promoted to the ninth tier of English football through the play-offs.

Colours and crest

F.C. Isle of Man play their home games in a red, white and black strip, and their away games in blue and white.

In July 2020, the club asked supporters to vote via social media on three different kit options. After a 10-day voting period, option one was the favourite choice of the official supporters, garnering 55% of the vote. Hope & Glory was announced as the club's kit manufacturer.

On 27 February, F.C. Isle of Man unveiled their club crest, stating "In line with the philosophy of our parent company Sporting Club Isle of Man, the crest has been carefully crafted to not only reflect the essence of our Island's history, colours and community but also, importantly, to represent our confident sporting approach." Featuring a black raven in an attack posture, one of the island's national birds, synonymous to the Celts and Vikings with battle, intelligence and problem solving. The crest also includes red and white colours, which represent the island's sunsets and Manannán's cloak. The four water lines represent the four sides of the Island, symbolising unity and community.

The club's motto, "Bee ny Share" also features on the club's crest and sleeve of the shirt, which is Manx for "Be Better".

The crest did not include the triskelion of the Island's national flag and coat of arms, which surprised many. However the three legs do appear of the back of the shirt. In a tweet sporting director Paul Jones stated, "It was in one of the earlier designs but we felt the 3-legs should be for National teams as it's sooo associated with the IOM. We also wanted to do things differently and reflect other parts of our heritage - to challenge the norm."

Kit suppliers and shirt sponsors

The club signed a three-year sponsorship deal with Manx Telecom, a local telecoms provider. Manx Telecom's IT infrastructure and managed services subsidiary Synapse 360 will appear on the away shirts. On 30 July 2020, F.C. Isle of Man announced a three-year deal with Rex Motor Company to become the team's first sleeve sponsor.

Mascot

The official mascot of F.C. Isle of Man is a generic bear, which is of uncertain origin and is trotted out at various sporting events around the Island. For a team nicknamed the Ravens, a group of supporters deemed a bear to be a wholly inappropriate mascot and thus the unofficial mascot, Raymond P Raven was born. Attending every home game, and even travelling away to AFC Darwen on 2 May 2022, and to Kendal Town on 4 February 2023, Raymond has become a firm fan favourite, and is widely considered to be the most known mascot in Manx sport. "Raymond is a Raven, Everywhere he goes" can be followed on Twitter @RaymondPRaven and tiktok @raymondpraven

Stadium

The club play at The Bowl in Douglas, a 3,500-seater stadium nicknamed "The Bernabowl" in reference to the Santiago Bernabéu Stadium in Madrid. The Bowl has been the club's home ground since July 2020.

Players

First-team squad 
As of 11 April 2022

Club captains 

 
Since the establishment of the club in 2019, several players have been club captain for F.C. Isle of Man. Frank Jones became the first captain of the club, but after an injury sustained during their first ever league match against Maine Road F.C. in which Jones scored the opening goal, Jack McVey and Chris Bass Jr were called upon to briefly act as captain, before the club settled on top goalscorer Sean Doyle in 2022.

Officials

Current coaching staff 

Managerial statistics, to 16 June 2020

Honours

League 
North West Counties League Division One South (Level 10, Step 6)
 Play-off winners : 2021–22

Cup 
North West Counties Division One Challenge (Edward Case) Cup

 Winners in 2021-22 (1-0)

Skipton Cup

 2nd in 2020–21 (1-1 P5-4)
 Winners in 2022-23 (2-0)

League awards 
North West Counties League Division One South club of the month award

 September 2021

Records 

 Highest victory: 10–2, against St Martins F.C. (2 November 2021)
 Home attendance: 3,230, against New Mills A.F.C. (16 April 2022)
 Goals (total): 41, by Sean Doyle
 Goals (season): 41, by Sean Doyle

Ownership and finances 

F.C. Isle of Man is owned by parent company Sporting Club Isle of Man, a club owned by the local community, through purchasing various memberships. Rajan Nandha is the club's finance director.

In the media 

 F.C. Isle of Man featured in an article for The Athletic titled "The Isle of Man: English football's final frontier"
 F.C. Isle of Man featured on BBC's Football Focus, which aired on 26 March 2022.
 F.C. Isle of Man featured in FourFourTwo Magazine twice, the first time in the January 2020 edition and then again in the January 2022 edition.

References

External links
Official website

Association football clubs established in 2019
Football clubs in the Isle of Man
North West Counties Football League clubs
2019 establishments in the Isle of Man
Expatriated football clubs